Bounce is a mobile game series that was published by Nokia.

Bounce (2000)

In the original Bounce game the player controls a red ball through many levels in a 2D side-scrolling game world. It came pre-loaded on many Nokia mobile phones and is considered one of the most well-known Nokia mobile games along with Snake.

The player controls a red ball with the requirements to go through all hoops. The ball can also become big, allowing it to float in water areas (which is coloured blue). Enemies come in the form of static yellow coloured obstacles (called "candles") as well as spiky blue moving objects (commonly referred to as "spiders" by the game fanbase). Touching an enemy will result in the loss of a life.

The Nokia 9210 Communicator (Series 80) from 2000 (released 2001) was the first device to feature the game. Through updated versions it was also pre-loaded on entry-level Series 40 handsets such as Nokia 6610 (2002), and Nokia 2600 (2004). The game had a total of 11 levels. 2 level packs (12-16, 17-21) were available to download for Series 60 and Series 80 (Symbian OS) Nokia handsets.

Different handsets also had different versions of the game, like the 9210 and 7650, which had levels 3 and 4 swapped, moving platforms, and other general changes, the 1280 which had a B&W version of the game, etc.

Series
Later Rovio Entertainment teamed up with Nokia to develop new Bounce games:
 Bounce Back for J2ME
 Bounce Tales for J2ME (2008)
 Bounce Boing Voyage for S60 (via N-Gage 2.0, 2008)
 Bounce Touch for Symbian^1 (first on Nokia 5800 XpressMusic, 2008)
 Bounce Evolution for Maemo (Nokia N900, 2009)
 Bounce Boing Battle for Symbian^1 (2010)

There have also been many mods of some of the Bounce games, mainly Bounce Tales. Many unofficial "remakes" of Bounce have been created and are available on the Google Play Store or App Store. However, none of these remakes feature levels 12–21, nor are there any remakes of the Bounce sequels.

One of the most iconic "remakes" of Bounce is the Red Ball series created by Russian game developer Evgeniy "Eugene" Fedoseev and hosted by King.com and Not Doppler. The four-part series of Adobe Flash games was developed with Box2D physics engine. The franchise also spawned multiple clones, mods, and is well-known among the speedrunning community. Fedoseev also developed a two-part spinoff series entitled Red and Blue Balls, wherein the player must navigate two different colored balls to their designated goals.

Level editor
An unofficial level creator called BouncEdit was created in 2003 which allowed a personalized level to be made.

See also

 Snake
Space Impact
 N-Gage
 Angry Birds

Images

References 

Side-scrolling video games
Nokia games
Mobile games
Video games developed in Finland
Video game franchises introduced in 2000
J2ME games